In the run-up to the next Swedish general election, various organisations carry out opinion polling to gauge voting intention in Sweden. The date range for these opinion polls are from the 2022 Swedish general election, held on 11 September, to the present day. The next election is scheduled for 13 September 2026, but a snap election may be held earlier.

Opinion polls

Graphical summary

2023

2022 

According to a threshold rule, any one particular party must receive at least 4% of the votes to be allocated a seat in the Riksdag
Red-Green bloc is a term used in Swedish politics to describe the left-wing bloc consisting of the Social Democrats (S), Left Party (V), Centre Party (C) and Green Party (MP)
Tidö Parties is a term used in Swedish politics to describe the right-wing bloc consisting of Moderates (M), Christian Democrats (KD), Liberals (L) and Sweden Democrats (SD)

Regional polling
Opinion polls for the general election in Sweden's regions and municipalities.

Stockholm municipality

Vote share in general election

Stockholm County
Excludes the Municipality of Stockholm.

Vote share in general election

Western Sweden
Includes the counties of Västra Götaland and  Halland

Vote share in general election

Southern Sweden
Includes the counties of Scania and Blekinge

Vote share in general election

Southeastern Sweden
Includes the counties of Kalmar, Kronoberg, Jönköping and the island of Gotland

Vote share in general election

Eastern Central Sweden
Includes the counties of Södermanland, Uppsala, Västmanland, Örebro and Östergötland

Vote share in general election

Northern Central Sweden
Includes the counties of Dalarna, Gävleborg and Värmland

Vote share in general election

Northern Sweden
Norrland - Northern Sweden, Includes the counties of Jämtland, Norrbotten, Västerbotten and Västernorrland

Vote share in general election

Voting by groups

Vote share by gender

Vote share by gender and age

Vote share by income level

Vote share by living arrangement

Vote share by ethnic background

Leadership polling

Approval ratings

Graphical summary

Confidence

Preferred prime minister

Performance in debate
Considered contribution in party leader debate from 1 (very bad) to 5 (very good)

SVT Agenda Debate - December 2022

Government approval rating

Other polling

NATO-membership

EU-membership

Membership of the Eurozone
Regarding implementation of the Euro as Sweden's official currency

Nuclear Energy

See also 
 Opinion polling for the 2018 Swedish general election
 Opinion polling for the 2022 Swedish general election

References 

Sweden
Opinion polling in Sweden